Arlind Afrim Ajeti (born 25 September 1993) is a professional footballer who plays as a centre-back for Italian  club Pordenone and the Albania national team. He holds dual nationality of Albania and Switzerland.

Early life
Ajeti was born in Basel, Switzerland from Albanian parents originally from Podujevo, Kosovo who had emigrated to Switzerland as did many Kosovans in the 1990s. Arlind was the first child of Afrim and Sylbije Ajeti. He is the older brother of twins also footballers, Albian who plays for Celtic and the Switzerland national under-21 team and Adonis who plays for St. Gallen. In July 2015 the whole family became Albanian citizens. His father Afrim was also a footballer who played as a goalkeeper.

Club career

Early years
Ajeti's father Afrim was an inspiration for Arlind to start football when, aged 8, Arlind started playing each day with his father before beginning to play youth football with FC Concordia Basel at age of 10. In 2004 he became a player of Basel, representing the under-16, under-18 and under-21 teams. With the under-21 team he played from the 2010–11 season until the 2014–15 in the 1. Liga Promotion, collecting overall 67 appearances in which he scored 4 goals.

Basel
On 2 January 2011, he signed his first professional contract with Basel, on a two and a half years contract, and was called up to the first team ahead of the 2011–12 season, He was eligible to play for the newly formed Basel under-19 team in the 2011–12 NextGen series, playing the team's first game against Tottenham Hotspur on 17 August 2011.

He made his league debut as a substitute on 28 August 2011, in the 2–1 home win against FC Thun. At the end of the 2011–12 season he won the Double, the League Championship title and the Swiss Cup with Basel. He only played once in the league and had just two Swiss Cup appearances with the first team squad, but played regularly with the U21 team.

At the end of the 2012–13 Swiss Super League season Ajeti won the Championship title for the second time and was Swiss Cup runner up with Basel. In the 2012–13 UEFA Europa League Basel advanced to the semi-finals, there being matched against the reigning UEFA Champions League holders Chelsea, but were knocked out being beaten 5–2 on aggregate.

During the beginning of the 2013–14 season on 5 October 2013 Ajeti scored his first league goal in the 2–1 away win against Lausanne-Sport. At the end of the 2013–14 Super League season Ajeti won his third league championship with Basel. They also reached the final of the 2013–14 Swiss Cup, but were beaten 2–0 by Zürich after extra time. In the 2013–14 Champions League season Basel in the group stage finished the group in third position to qualify for Europa League knockout phase and here they advanced as far as the quarter-finals.

The 2014–15 season was a very successful one for Basel. The championship was won for the sixth time in a row that season and in the 2014–15 Swiss Cup they reached the final. But for the third season in a row, they finished as runners-up, losing 3–0 to FC Sion in the final. Basel entered the Champions League in the group stage and reached the knockout phase as on 9 December 2014 they managed a 1–1 draw at Anfield against Liverpool. But then Basel then lost to Porto in the Round of 16. Basel played a total of 65 matches (36 Swiss League fixtures, 6 Swiss Cup, 8 Champions League and 15 test matches). However under trainer Paulo Sousa the season 2014–15 was not a successful one for Ajeti. He totalled solely 17 appearances for the team, just 3 in the League, 2 in the Cup and only 1 in the Champions League, however 11 appearances in test games.

Ajeti became one of the three Albania international footballers who participated in the knockout stage of the UEFA Champions League for the first time in history, along with his Basel teammates Shkëlzen Gashi and Taulant Xhaka.

Frosinone
On 24 November 2015, after six months as a free agent following the ending of his contract at Basel, Ajeti signed a contract until the end of the season with the newly promoted Serie A side Frosinone. He was given the vacant number 93, a number which he choose due to his year of birth. He was presented to the media two days later, where he said that playing in Serie A was a "dream come true", and thanked the club for giving him this opportunity.

He was called up for his first game on 6 December 2015, against Chievo Verona at the Stadio Matusa where he was an unused substitute. He finally made his debut against Sassuolo on 6 January when he was involved in an own goal but he scored too in that match.

In the end Frosinone was relegated to Serie B.

Torino
On 7 July 2016, Torino completed the signing of Ajeti on a free transfer. He penned a three-year contract, with the option to extend for a further two years. His salary was reported to be €500,000 per season. He made it his debut on 5 February 2017 against Empoli in a 1–1 draw. A week later he scored his first goal against Pescara in the 9th minute to send the score 2–0 and conceded an own goal later, but however Torino won the match 5–3.<

Loan to Crotone
On 1 August 2017, Ajeti was loaned out to fellow Serie A team F.C. Crotone until the end of the 2017–18 season with an option to buy. In the match against Chievo on 17 December 2017, Ajeti made a strike for goal that was diverted into the empty net by Ante Budimir, which was enough to give Crotone a 1–0 victory.

Grasshoppers
On 13 September 2018, Ajeti officially become a Grasshoppers player by signing an initial one-year contract with an option to extend for a further two years, thus returning to Switzerland after three years.

Vejle BK
On 18 February 2020, Danish 1st Division club Vejle Boldklub confirmed that they had signed Ajeti. The club did not reveal how long Ajeti had signed for.

Padova
On 16 November 2021, he signed with Padova in Serie C for one season with an option to extend for another year.

Pordenone
On 12 July 2022, Ajeti joined Pordenone on a two-year deal.

International career

Switzerland
Ajeti made his debut for the Switzerland U17 team in the game against Sweden on 4 March 2010. He made his debut for the Switzerland U-18 team on 15 September 2010 in the 2–2 draw with the Belgium U18. During the qualifications to the 2011 UEFA European Under-19 Football Championship Ajeti played his first game for the Switzerland U19 as substitute in the game Group 2 game against England on 2 June 2011.

On 6 February 2013 Ajeti made his debut for the Swiss U21 team in the El Madrigal stadium in Villarreal, Spain. He played the entire game, but it ended in a 1–0 defeat against the Slovakian U21 team. He played his final game for the Swiss youth teams on 24 September 2014. This was in the 2–0 defeat against the Ukraine U21 team during the qualification matches to the 2015 UEFA European Under-21 Championship.

Albania
The abandoned match between Serbia and Albania played on 14 October 2014 where Albanian players showed bravery by defending their national symbol against the permanent political enemies Serbia in their home, motivated many footballers of Albanian descent to express their desire to play for Albania national team and Ajeti was the first one to do so by citing that he wants to play for the senior team of Albania.

He made his debut for Albania on 14 November 2014 in the "Group I centralised" friendly match against the Euro 2016 hosts, France, coming on as a substitute in the 69th minute in place of Amir Abrashi. On 5 March 2015, Ajeti received Albanian citizenship among fellow defender of Basel Naser Aliji to be eligible to play for Albania national team in official qualifiers matches.

Euro 2016
On 21 May 2016, Ajeti was named in Albania's preliminary 27-man squad for UEFA Euro 2016, and in Albania's final 23-man squad on 31 May where he was given the shirt number 18.

On 28 May, he scored his first international goal during the Euro 2016 warm-up match against Qatar, which ended in a 3–1 win.

Ajeti was an unused substitute in Albania's first ever UEFA Euro match against Switzerland which ended in a 1–0 defeat. In the second match against the host country France, due to the dismissal of Lorik Cana, Ajeti started and put on a strong performance but was forced to be replaced in the 85th minute due to an injury; his ouster weakened the team which conceded two late goals. In the third and final match against Romania on 19 June, Ajeti produced a Man of the Match performance by helping the team to keep a clean sheet in a 1–0 victory to provide last 16 hope. With Ajeti on the pitch, Albania did not concede any goal during the course of the competition, making him a favourite of many Albania fans. Albania finished the group in the third position with three points and with a goal difference –2, and was ranked last in the third-placed teams, which eventually eliminated them.

2018 FIFA World Cup qualification
Ajeti was unable to join the Albania national team in their first three 2018 FIFA World Cup qualification matches in September and October 2016 due to an injury. He was called up for the fourth game against Israel on 12 November 2016 but unable to recover in time to play in this match. He was called up for the first time after the full recovery for a 2018 FIFA World Cup qualification match against Italy on 24 March and a friendly against Bosnia and Herzegovina on 28 March 2017.

Personal life
In June 2015, Ajeti married Pranvera Krasniqi. Despite having been born and raised in Switzerland, all of the Ajeti brothers have knowledge of the Albanian language, and mostly communicated in Albanian in their private life.

Career statistics

Club

International

Scores and results list Albania's goal tally first, score column indicates score after each Ajeti goal.

Honours
Basel
 Swiss Super League: 2011–12, 2012–13, 2013–14, 2014–15
 Swiss Cup: 2011–12; runner-up: 2012–13, 2013–14, 2014–15
 Uhren Cup: 2013
 U18 Swiss Champion: 2009–10

Basel U21
1. Liga Promotion runner-up: 2012–13

Individual
UEFA Euro 2016 Group A - Romania vs Albania: Man of the Match

References

External links

 
 
 
 U21 U20 U19 U18 U17 profiles at Swiss FA
 Arlind Ajeti profile at FSHF.org

1993 births
Living people
Footballers from Basel
Albanian footballers
Association football defenders
Swiss Super League players
Serie A players
Serie B players
Serie C players
Danish 1st Division players
FC Basel players
Frosinone Calcio players
Torino F.C. players
F.C. Crotone players
Grasshopper Club Zürich players
Vejle Boldklub players
Calcio Padova players
Pordenone Calcio players
Switzerland youth international footballers
Switzerland under-21 international footballers
Albania international footballers
UEFA Euro 2016 players
Albanian expatriate footballers
Swiss people of Albanian descent
Albanian expatriate sportspeople in Italy
Albanian expatriate sportspeople in Denmark
Expatriate footballers in Italy
Expatriate men's footballers in Denmark
Kosovo Albanians